Lycée Saint-Marc, Lyon, is a private Catholic secondary school and college, located in Lyon, in the heart of the Ainay district, in the Auvergne-Rhône-Alpes region of France. The school was founded by the Society of Jesus in 1871 and forms part of the Center Saint-Marc. The school is a Catholic institution under contract of association with the State.

Rankings 
In 2015, the school ranked 27th out of 67 in their department in terms of quality of education, and 686th at the national level.

Notable staff
 Alexis Jenni, a novelist and biology teacher

See also

 Catholic Church in France
 Education in France
 List of Jesuit schools

References  

Jesuit secondary schools in France
Schools in Lyon
Educational institutions established in 1871
1871 establishments in France